The Norfolk Marine Park (formerly known as the Norfolk Commonwealth Marine Reserve) is an Australian marine park located in the waters immediately offshore of Norfolk Island, an external territory of Australia. The park is assigned IUCN category IV and is one of 8 parks managed under the Temperate East Marine Parks Network.

Conservation values

Species and habitat
Biologically important areas for protected humpback whales and a number of migratory seabirds.
The Tasman Front is a region of intermediate productivity that separates the warm, nutrient-poor waters of the Coral Sea from the cold, nutrient-rich waters of the Tasman Sea. It supports high productivity; aggregations of marine life; biodiversity and endemism in the region.
Includes benthic habitats thought to act as stepping stones for faunal dispersal, connecting deep-water fauna from New Caledonia to New Zealand.

Bioregions and ecology
Examples of the ecosystems of the Norfolk Island Province provincial bioregion.
Represents bank/shoals, basin, canyon, deep/hole/valley, knoll/abyssal-hills/hills/mountains/peak, pinnacle, plateau, ridge, saddle, seamount/guyot, shelf, slope, trench/trough.
 Norfolk Ridge (high productivity, aggregations of marine life; biodiversity and endemism).

History
The marine park was proclaimed under the EPBC Act on 14 December 2013 and renamed Norfolk Marine Park on 9 October 2017. The management plan and protection measures of the marine park came into effect for the first time on 1 July 2018.

Summary of protection zones
The Norfolk Marine Park has been assigned IUCN protected area category IV. However, within the marine park there are three protection zones, each zone has an IUCN category and related rules for managing activities to ensure the protection of marine habitats and species.

The following table is a summary of the zoning rules within the Norfolk Marine Park:

See also

 Protected areas managed by the Australian government

References

External links
 Temperate East Marine Parks Network - Parks Australia
 Temperate East Marine Parks Network - environment.gov.au (outdated)

Australian marine parks